Romie may refer to:

People
Romie Adanza, American kickboxer
Romie Hamilton, American football coach
Romie J. Palmer, American politician and jurist 

Places
Romie, California, nickname of Fort Romie, California, United States